La Ferté-Milon is a commune in the Aisne department in Hauts-de-France, northern France.

Geography
La Ferté-Milon is situated on the river Ourcq, 27 km southwest of Soissons and 30 km northeast of Meaux. La Ferté-Milon station has rail connections to Meaux and Paris.

Sights
In La Ferté-Milon stand the ruins of an unfinished castle, whose façade was 200 m long and 38 m high. The singular form of the tower walls was probably designed to resist cannons and protect the gate. The façade is preceded by a moat. On the right is a square tower of which two bare walls remain. The top of the ramparts is adorned with machicolation. Access to the town was protected by a former gate of which two towers remain.

Behind the ramparts, two 160 mm cannons from 1909 sit facing towards the valley. One is annotated in Russian with the number 5085.

Population

Personalities
The dramatist Jean Racine (1639–1699) was born in La Ferté-Milon. He was one of the three great playwrights of 17th-century France.

A statue of Racine as a child is located at the bottom of the paved Ruelle des rats. Nearby is a slate-roofed church with a square belfry with four turrets in each corner, one of which serves as a staircase.

See also
 Communes of the Aisne department
 List of medieval bridges in France

References

External links

 La Ferté-Milon

Communes of Aisne
Aisne communes articles needing translation from French Wikipedia